Polythlipta is a genus of moths of the family Crambidae.

Species
Polythlipta albicaudalis Snellen, 1880
Polythlipta annulifera Walker, 1866
Polythlipta camptozona Hampson, 1910
Polythlipta cerealis Lederer, 1863
Polythlipta conjunctalis Caradja, 1925
Polythlipta distinguenda Grünberg, 1910
Polythlipta distorta Moore, 1888
Polythlipta divaricata Moore, 1885
Polythlipta euroalis Swinhoe, 1889
Polythlipta guttiferalis Hampson, 1909
Polythlipta inconspicua Moore, 1888
Polythlipta liquidalis Leech, 1889
Polythlipta macralis Lederer, 1863
Polythlipta maculalis South in Leech & South, 1901
Polythlipta nodiferalis Walker, 1866
Polythlipta ossealis Lederer, 1863
Polythlipta peragrata Moore, 1888
Polythlipta rivulalis Snellen, 1890
Polythlipta vagalis Walker, 1866

References

Spilomelinae
Crambidae genera
Taxa named by Julius Lederer